Bebearia tessmanni, or Tessmann's forester, is a butterfly in the family Nymphalidae. It is found in Nigeria, Cameroon, Equatorial Guinea, Gabon, the Republic of the Congo, the Central African Republic and the Democratic Republic of the Congo. The habitat consists of forests.

Subspecies
Bebearia tessmanni tessmanni (Cameroon, Equatorial Guinea, Gabon, Central African Republic)
Bebearia tessmanni innocuoides Hecq, 2000 (western Nigeria)
Bebearia tessmanni kwiluensis Hecq, 1989 (Congo, Democratic Republic of the Congo)

References

Butterflies described in 1910
tini